Royal Trust Bank v National Westminster Bank plc [1996] BCC 613 was a decision of the Court of Appeal in relation to the nature of a floating charge.

This decision, together with an academic article written by Roy Goode, is sometimes looked upon as the turning point in relation to the stricter requirements in relation to control of the proceeds of book debts and other future receivables laid down in subsequent cases.

Facts
Brookes Associates Finance Limited was in the business of providing equipment under hire purchase agreements.  In 1992 Royal Trust Bank (called RTB in the judgment) extended finance to the company, and took a deed of charge under which the company purported to charge the benefit of certain hire purchase agreements deposited with RTB.  Those deeds of charge required all sums paid to the company under the hire purchase agreement to be deposited into a specified bank account which the company was required to open with RTB.  No such bank account was ever opened, and the company deposited the sums received under those contracts into an account with National Westminster Bank, which it was free to draw upon.

Although some sums were paid to RTB from that account in repayment of the loans, when the company entered into financial difficulty, NatWest Bank blocked the account.  RTB sued NatWest Bank alleging that it held the sums in that account as constructive trustee for RTB.  The company did not appear and was not represented.  At first instance noted that he had been advised that it was in receivership at the time of the hearing.

The case came before Jonathan Parker J who decided in favour of RTB.  NatWest Bank then appealed to the Court of Appeal.

Decision
Nourse LJ gave the lead judgment in the Court of Appeal, and allowed the appeal on the basis that the company had at all times been free to deal with the proceeds in those accounts, and thus it was never a trustee of them.  Accordingly, it was not material what notice NatWest Bank had or had not received - it could not become a constructive trustee.

In his short decision, Millett LJ noted that the trial judge had determined that the charge created was a fixed charge, and that no appeal had been made against that finding.  However, he was satisfied that this was not correct, and that the proper construction of the charge was a floating charge.  Accordingly, the company was free to deal with the proceeds of the hire purchase contracts as it saw fit, including paying them over to NatWest Bank, which meant that NatWest Bank was at liberty to apply them to the company's indebtedness to it pursuant to the banker's right to combine accounts.

Millet LJ held:

Authority

Notes

United Kingdom company case law
United Kingdom insolvency case law
Court of Appeal (England and Wales) cases
1996 in case law
1996 in British law
NatWest Group litigation